Neukölln is a Berlin U-Bahn station located on the .

References

U7 (Berlin U-Bahn) stations
Buildings and structures in Neukölln
Railway stations in Germany opened in 1930